Gaius Mamilius was a politician in the Roman Republic who served as one of the plebeian tribunes for 109 BC. During his year as tribune, he established a special tribunal called the Mamilian Commission to investigate corruption and treason.

References

Tribunes of the plebs
People of the Roman Republic
2nd-century BC Romans
Mamilii